The following radio stations broadcast on FM frequency 96.7 MHz:

Argentina
 Armonía in San Juan, San Juan
 Cadena Space in Córdoba, Córdoba
 LRI731 Centenario in Capitán Bermúdez, Santa Fe 
 Expedito in Joaquin V. González, Salta
 Fortaleza de Jesús in Ingeniero Juárez, Formosa
 Glaciar Argentino in Rosario, Santa Fe
 Gol in Santa Fe de la Vera Cruz, Santa Fe
 Impacto in Miramar, Buenos Aires
 LA96.7 in La Plata, Buenos Aires
 Master in Colonia San Bartolomé, Córdoba
 Nacional Clásica in Buenos Aires
 OK in San Rafael, Mendoza
 Radio María in Los Juríes, Santiago del Estero
 Uno in Pergamino, Buenos Aires
 Vorterix Rock in Santa Rosa, La Pampa

Australia
 Radio National in Bathurst, New South Wales
 Triple J in Latrobe Valley, Victoria
 2GHR in Greater Hume, New South Wales
 5ADD in Adelaide, South Australia

Canada (Channel 244)
 CBAF-18-FM in Church Point, Nova Scotia
 CBRV-FM in Vanderhoof, British Columbia
 CBV-FM-1 in Ste-Anne-de-Beaupre, Quebec
 CBV-FM-7 in St-Georges-de-Beauce, Quebec
 CBYH-FM in Harrison Hot Springs, British Columbia
 CBYL-FM in Lumby, British Columbia
 CFNW-FM in Port Au Choix, Newfoundland
 CFZM-1-FM in Toronto, Ontario
 CFWE-FM-3 in Moose Hills, Alberta
 CFXW-FM in Whitecourt, Alberta
 CHVR-FM in Pembroke, Ontario
 CHYM-FM in Kitchener, Ontario
 CHYR-FM in Leamington, Ontario
 CIBM-FM-3 in Sully, Quebec
 CIGN-FM in Coaticook, Quebec
 CILT-FM in Steinbach, Manitoba
 CIMS-FM-1 in Dalhousie, New Brunswick
 CJWV-FM in Peterborough, Ontario
 CKGF-2-FM in Greenwood, British Columbia
 CKLU-FM in Sudbury, Ontario
 CKUA-FM-11 in Fort McMurray, Alberta
 VF2350 in Granisle, British Columbia
 VF2428 in Parson, British Columbia
 VF2528 in Creston, British Columbia
 VF2576 in Cawston, British Columbia

China 
 CNR The Voice of China in Shaoyang and Weifang
 CNR Business Radio in Zhengzhou

Greece 
Melody 96.7 at Limnos

India
Vividh Bharati

Indonesia
 IMI Radio in Jakarta, Indonesia

Ireland
 RTE Lyric FM (Dublin transmitter)

Malaysia
 Asyik FM in Gerik, Perak
 Minnal FM in Kedah, Perlis & Penang
 Sinar in Klang Valley and Eastern Pahang

Mexico
 XHBY-FM in Tuxpan, Veracruz
 XHESE-FM in Champotón, Campeche
 XHGNK-FM in Nuevo Laredo, Tamaulipas
 XHIK-FM in Piedras Negras, Coahuila
 XHNGS-FM in Nogales, Sonora
 XHPAZ-FM in La Paz, Baja California Sur
 XHPCPQ-FM in Felipe Carrillo Puerto, Quintana Roo
 XHPEBJ-FM in Léon, Guanajuato
 XHPZ-FM in Ciudad Guzmán, Jalisco
 XHRLF-FM in Mezcala, Guerrero
 XHSCHQ-FM in Zitácuaro, Michoacán
 XHSCKH-FM in San Antonio La Isla, Estado De Mexico
 XHSPH-FM in San Pedro Huamelula, Oaxaca
 XHY-FM in Celaya, Guanajuato
 XHZK-FM in Tepatitlán de Morelos, Jalisco

Philippines
 DWSK in Baguio City
 DWSL in Olongapo City
 DYKR in Bacolod City
 DYEM in Dumaguete City
 DYCJ in Tacloban City
 DXRG in General Santos City

Romania
 Radio Boom in Ramnicu Sarat, Buzau (TVSat Media Group)

Turkey

 TRT Radyo Haber in Adana
 Radyo 3 in Bursa

United Arab Emirates
 Hit 96.7 FM launched by Arabian Radio Network

United Kingdom
Radio City 96.7 in Liverpool, Merseyside 
West FM in Ayr, Ayrshire
 Imagine Radio in Peak District
Q Radio in Belfast
Free Radio in Kidderminster

United States (Channel 244)
  in Poplar Bluff, Missouri
  in Fowler, California
 KBDB-FM in Forks, Washington
 KBEL-FM in Idabel, Oklahoma
  in Redlands, California
 KCCG-LP in Greenville, Texas
 KCIL in Morgan City, Louisiana
  in Columbia, Missouri
 KCRF-FM in Lincoln City, Oregon
 KCRM-LP in Marshalltown, Iowa
 KDDE-LP in American Falls, Idaho
  in North Mankato, Minnesota
 KGAP-LP in Los Angeles, California
  in Georgetown, Texas
  in Carlin, Nevada
 KICN-LP in Portland, Oregon
  in Albia, Iowa
  in Laramie, Wyoming
 KISN (FM) in Belgrade, Montana
 KKCQ-FM in Bagley, Minnesota
  in Preston, Idaho
  in Santa Paula, California
 KLXQ in Hot Springs, Arkansas
 KMDZ (FM) in Las Vegas, New Mexico
  in Benton City, Washington
 KMPK in McPherson, Kansas
  in Manteca, California
 KNDH in Carbondale, Colorado
 KNMB in Capitan, New Mexico
 KNOB (FM) in Healdsburg, California
 KNUM-LP in Portland, Oregon
  in Newport, Arkansas
 KOYE in Frankston, Texas
 KQZZ in Crary, North Dakota
 KRAM-LP in Montevideo, Minnesota
  in Lake Havasu City, Arizona
 KRNK in Casper, Wyoming
 KSFE in Grants, New Mexico
 KSHF-LP in Espanola, New Mexico
  in Larned, Kansas
  in Solvang, California
 KTCK-FM in Flower Mound, Texas
  in La Quinta, California
 KUTN in Levan, Utah
 KWCL-FM in Oak Grove, Louisiana
  in Santa Ana, California
  in Williams, Arizona
 KWRA-LP in Waco, Texas
 KWWW-FM in Quincy, Washington
  in Sweetwater, Texas
 KXRD in Fayetteville, Arkansas
 KYLB in Turkey, Texas
 KYLI in Bunkerville, Nevada
 KZAP (FM) in Paradise, California
  in Shelby, Montana
  in Sartell, Minnesota
 KZZH-LP in Eureka, California
  in Annville, Kentucky
 WARW in Port Chester, New York
  in Algoma, Wisconsin
 WBKQ in Alexandria, Indiana
 WBQA in Boothbay Harbor, Maine
  in Fostoria, Ohio
  in Auburn, Kentucky
  in Bloomington, Indiana
 WBZW in Union City, Georgia
  in Easton, Maryland
 WCIO in Oswego, New York
 WCKK in Walnut Grove, Mississippi
  in Cambridge, Ohio
  in La Porte, Indiana
 WCOR-FM in Portville, New York
  in Celina, Ohio
  in Virden, Illinois
  in Carlyle, Illinois
  in Halfway, Maryland
 WERA-LP in Arlington, Virginia
 WFFF-FM in Columbia, Mississippi
  in Vincennes, Indiana
 WGBL in Gulfport, Mississippi
 WGNX in Colchester, Illinois
 WGOV-FM in Valdosta, Georgia
 WHTQ in Whiting, Wisconsin
  in Normal, Illinois
  in Ashland, Wisconsin
 WJNA in Westminster, South Carolina
 WJVG-LP in Columbus, Ohio
 WKGL-FM in Loves Park, Illinois
  in Elizabeth City, North Carolina
  in Kingwood, West Virginia
  in Wellston, Ohio
  in Roxboro, North Carolina
  in Pine Hill, Alabama
 WLLF in Mercer, Pennsylvania
  in Lisbon, New Hampshire
  in Cayce, South Carolina
  in Cadillac, Michigan
 WMHH in Clifton Park, New York
  in McMillan, Michigan
 WMOD in Bolivar, Tennessee
 WMTB-LP in St. Petersburg, Florida
  in Opelika, Alabama
 WMYL in Halls Crossroads, Tennessee
 WNKX-FM in Centerville, Tennessee
 WNNN-LP in Noxapater, Mississippi
 WNUC-LP in Detroit, Michigan
  in Madison, Indiana
  in Danville, Pennsylvania
 WQER-LP in Rockville, Maryland
  in Rochester, New Hampshire
 WRGZ in Rogers City, Michigan
 WSEJ-LP in Spartanburg, South Carolina
  in Pontotoc, Mississippi
 WSSR in Joliet, Illinois
 WSUB-LP in Ashaway, Rhode Island
  in Brattleboro, Vermont
  in Albion, Michigan
  in Republic, Michigan
  in Burnham, Pennsylvania
 WVPO in Lehman Township, Pennsylvania
 WVVY-LP in Tisbury, Massachusetts
 WWUC-LP in Union City, Pennsylvania
 WWZW in Buena Vista, Virginia
 WXOF in Yankeetown, Florida
  in Willsboro, New York
  in Morristown, New York
 WZPH-LP in Dade City, Florida

References

Lists of radio stations by frequency